Arahant Upatissa (1st century CE – 2nd century CE) was a Sri Lankan Theravada Buddhist monk and the author of The Path to Freedom, or Vimuttimagga, which serves as a Buddhist meditation manual, broadly considered a great and important work. It is similar to the Path of Purification, or Visuddhimagga by Buddhaghosa, but less analytical and more practical in its treatment of the traditional meditation objects. Both are commentaries, not from the Pali Canon, but very relevant to it, especially to the section of the Pali Canon called the Abhidhamma which contains the philosophical treatises of the Buddha.

References

Theravada Buddhism writers
Sri Lankan Theravada Buddhists
2nd-century writers
Sri Lankan Buddhist monks
2nd-century Buddhists
2nd-century Sri Lankan people